Fazil Abdulovich Iskander (6 March 1929 – 31 July 2016) was a Soviet and Russian writer and poet known in the former Soviet Union for his descriptions of Caucasian life. He authored various stories, including "Zashita Chika", which features a crafty and likable young boy named "Chik", but is probably best known for the picaresque novel Sandro of Chegem and its sequel The Gospel According to Chegem.

Biography

Early life

Fazil Abdulovich Iskander was born in 1929 in the cosmopolitan port city of Sukhumi, Georgia (then part of the USSR) to an Iranian father (Abdul Ibragimovich Iskander) and an Abkhazian mother (Leili Khasanovna Iskander). His father was deported to Iran in 1938 and sent to a penal camp where he died in 1957. His father was the victim of Joseph Stalin's deportation policies of the national minorities of the Caucasus. As a result, Fazil and his brother Feredun and his sister Giuli were raised by his mother's Abkhazian family. Fazil was only nine years old at that time.

Career
The most famous intellectual of Abkhazia, he first became well known in the mid-1960s along with other representatives of the "young prose" movement like Yury Kazakov and Vasily Aksyonov, especially for what is perhaps his best story, Sozvezdie kozlotura (1966), variously translated as "The Goatibex Constellation," "The Constellation of the Goat-Buffalo," and "Constellation of Capritaurus." It is written from the point of view of a young newspaperman who returns to his native Abkhazia, joins the staff of a local newspaper, and is caught up in the publicity campaign for a newly produced farm animal, a cross between a goat and a West Caucasian tur (Capra caucasica); a "remarkable satire of Lysenko's genetics and Khrushchev's agricultural campaigns, it was harshly criticized for showing the Soviet Union in a bad light."

He is probably best known in the English speaking world for Sandro of Chegem, a picaresque novel that recounts life in a fictional Abkhaz village from the early years of the 20th century until the 1970s, which evoked praise for the author as "an Abkhazian Mark Twain." Mr. Iskander's humor, like Mark Twain's, has a tendency to sneak up on you instead of hitting you over the head. This rambling, amusing and ironic work has been considered as an example of magic realism, although Iskander himself said he "did not care for Latin American magic realism in general". Five films were made based upon parts of the novel.

Iskander distanced himself from the Abkhaz secessionist strivings in the late 1980s and criticised both Georgian and Abkhaz communities of Abkhazia for their ethnic prejudices.  He warned that Abkhazia could become a new Nagorno-Karabakh.  Later Iskander resided in Moscow and was a writer for the newspaper Kultura. 

On 3 September 2011, a statue of Iskander's literary character Chik was unveiled on Sukhumi's Muhajir Quay.

Family
Iskander had been married to a Russian poet Antonina Mikhailovna Khlebnikova since 1960. In 2011 the couple published a book of poems entitled Snow and Grapes to celebrate their golden wedding anniversary. They had one son and one daughter.

Death 
Iskander died in his home on 31 July 2016 in Peredelkino, aged 87.

Quotes 
"Perhaps the most touching and profound characteristic of childhood is an unquestioning belief in the rule of common sense. The child believes that the world is rational and hence regards everything irrational as some sort of obstacle to be pushed aside. . . . The best people, I think, are those who over the years have managed to retain this childhood faith in the world's rationality. For it is this faith which provides man with passion and zeal in his struggle against the twin follies of cruelty and stupidity." (The Goatibex Constellation)

„all serious Russian and European literature is an endless commentary on the gospel.“

(„Reflections of a Writer“ by Fazil Iskander)

Awards and prizes
 USSR State Prize (1989) - for his novel "Sandro of Chegem"
 Alfred Toepfer foundation's Pushkin Prize (1992)
 State Prize of the Russian Federation in Literature and Arts (1993, 2013) 
 Triumph Prize (1999).
 Order of Honour and Glory, 1st class (Abkhazia, 18 June 2002) 
 Order of Merit for the Fatherland;)
2nd class (29 September 2004)
3rd class (3 March 1999)
4th class (13 March 2009, presented on February 17, 2010.)
 Honorary Member of Russian Academy of Arts
 Yasnaya Polyana Literary Award (2011) - for the novel "Sandro of Chegem"
 Ivan Bunin literary award (2013)

In 2009, Bank of Abkhazia issued a commemorative silver coin from the series "Outstanding Personalities of Abkhazia", dedicated to Fazil Iskander denomination of 10 apsaras. 

Already after the writer's death, the Fazil Iskander International Literary Prize was established in Russia in three nominations: prose, poetry and screenplay based on the works of Iskander.  The Fazil Iskander International Literary Award is now in its sixth year.  was established on August 3, 2016 by the Russian branch of the International Russian PEN Center.

Works

Works in English translation
Forbidden Fruit and Other Stories, Central Books LTD, 1972.
The Goatibex Constellation, Ardis, 1975.
 
 Contemporary Russian Prose (English and Russian Edition), 1980 
Sandro of Chegem, Vintage Books, 1983. 
The Gospel According to Chegem, Vintage Books, 1984.
Chik and His Friends, Ardis 1985.
 Bolshoi den bolshogo doma: Rasskazy, 1986
 
Rabbits and Boa Constrictors, Ardis, 1989. (Co-authored with Ronald E. Peterson) 
The Old House Under the Cypress Tree, Faber and Faber, 1996.
The Thirteenth Labour of Hercules, Raduga, 1997.
 Rasskazy, povestʹ, skazka, dialog, ėsse, stikhi (Zerkalo) (Russian Edition), 1999 
 Parom (Russian Edition), 2004 
 Kozy i Shekspir: [Goats and Shakespear: ], Russian Edition, 2008
 Put' iz Variag v Greki (The Road from the Varangians to the Greeks), Russian Edition 2008 
 Zoloto Vil'gel'ma: Povesti, Rasskazy (Gold of Vilgel'm: Stories, tales), 2010.
 L'energia della vergogna (Italian Edition), 2014. 
 The Mystery of Conscience, 2016. 
 Departures, 2016 
 Sandró de Cheguem (Narrativa) (Spanish Edition), 2017 
 Druzia-priiateli/Detstvo Chika, Russian Edition 2018 
 Zvezdnyy kamen (Russian Edition), 2019 
 The Commonwealth Reconstructed

Online
Works by Fazil Iskander on Archive.org

Further reading
Russian writer of Iranian origin hailed in Moscow. 
Kriza, Elisa. "Blood Carnival and Its Variations in Mexican and Soviet Subversive Satires by René Avilés and Fazil Iskander." Comparative Literature Studies, vol. 58 no. 2, 2021, p. 397-430. https://www.muse.jhu.edu/article/794578.

See also

References

External links
 Fazil Iskander IMDb
 Books by Fazil Iskander

1929 births
2016 deaths
People from Sukhumi
Abkhazian writers
Iranian writers
Iranian people of Abkhazian descent
Recipients of the USSR State Prize
Burials at Novodevichy Cemetery
Recipients of the Order "For Merit to the Fatherland", 2nd class
State Prize of the Russian Federation laureates
Pushkin Prize winners
Russian male novelists
Soviet novelists
Soviet male writers
20th-century Russian male writers
Soviet short story writers
20th-century Russian short story writers
Honorary Members of the Russian Academy of Arts
Russian humorists
Russian people of Abkhazian descent
Russian people of Iranian descent
Russian male short story writers
Soviet people of Iranian descent
Maxim Gorky Literature Institute alumni